The Herman Behr Mansion is a building located at 82 Pierrepont Street at the corner of Henry Street in Brooklyn Heights, Brooklyn, New York City. Constructed in 1888–89 to a design of Brooklyn architect Frank Freeman, it has been described as "the city's finest Romanesque Revival house".

History

The mansion has had a colorful history. It was originally designed by leading Brooklyn architect Frank Freeman for industrialist Herman Behr, an abrasives manufacturer and the father of tennis player Karl Behr and golfer Max Behr.

The Behr family eventually moved upstate, and in 1919 the Behr mansion was substantially expanded and became the Palm Hotel, which was a brothel in its declining years. It became a Franciscan brothers' residence in 1961, in conjunction with their operation of St. Francis College. It was converted into rental apartments in 1977. In 2008, the building exchanged hands for $10,980,000.

The story that Xaviera Hollander's brothel was in the Behr House is an urban legend.  It was in an apartment building at 73rd Street and York Avenue, according to her book, The Happy Hooker.

Description

The Herman Behr Mansion has been hailed as "the city's finest Romanesque Revival house" and "one of the great masterpieces of Romanesque Revival design in New York City." It has been described as "one of the real treats of Brooklyn Heights, a Romanesque color-fantasy of salmon brick, terra cotta and rockfaced sandstone with crazy animal ornament reminiscent of modern, violent comic books -- grimacing lizards, lions and dragons."

The house was originally three stories high, not including the basement and attic. A six-story extension, not much higher than the original building, was added to the rear of the property in 1919 when it became the Palm Hotel.

The first floor of the mansion is finished in undressed sandstone, with the exception of the 1919 extension. The rest of the exterior is constructed of  Belleville brownstone with a brick terra cotta facing. The entrance is accessed by a broad stone staircase, flanked by two semicircular towers or bays which rise to the height of the third floor where they each form a separate balcony. A third balcony on the second floor runs between the two. Each of the bays features three large bay windows per floor. Above and between the bays, on the third floor, are two semicircular windows, surmounted by a single rectangular window in a gable, which in turn is flanked by two tall chimneys. The roof itself is steeply sloped, gabled and tiled. The bays at the front of the building are echoed by a third, smaller ground floor bay in the center of the building in Henry Street.

The entranceway opens upon a lobby finished in mahogany and containing a small library and a fireplace of Scotch sandstone with an "intricately carved" mantelpiece. In the building's original layout, to the right of the lobby lay a large drawing room, two thirds of the building deep, finished in polished mahogany, with a panelled ceiling of white and gold. To the rear of the drawing room, separated by sliding doors, was the dining room, finished in oak and with a red Numidian marble fireplace with a carved oak mantelpiece. The library, which directly faced the building's entrance, was finished in cherrywood, with a domed roof of white and gold, the latter color predominating.

To the left of the entrance, running the length of the building on the Henry St. side, was the parlor, culminating at the rear in the servants' dressing room, pantries, and a staircase leading to the kitchen in the basement. The basement level also included a billiard room, butler's room, servants' sittingroom and laundry. The second floor contained bedrooms, a dressing room and bathroom. The woodwork in the bedrooms was finished in enamelled ivory, and the mantels in onyx. The third floor contained a chamber hall and several smaller rooms. In the attic was a studio, storage space and servants' quarters.

References
Notes

Bibliography
 Morrone, Francis; Iska, James (2002): The Architectural Guidebook to New York City, Revised Edition, Gibbs Smith, .

External links
 

Houses completed in 1889
Frank Freeman buildings
Richardsonian Romanesque architecture in New York City
Houses in Brooklyn
Brooklyn Heights